SAS Skilpad was a mine-layer vessel of the South African Navy during and after the Second World War.  She was launched as the German trawler Polaris and after being captured by the Allies in 1940, she was commissioned into the Royal Navy as a war-prize and named HMS Spindrift.  During the course of the war she was transferred to the South African Naval Forces, being based in Saldanha Bay and later in Durban.  After being kept in storage for several years after the end of the war, she sank at her moorings in Durban during a gale in 1953, leading to her being decommissioned and sold for scrap in 1957.

History 
‘’Polaris’’ was built in Germany in 1936 as a general purpose trawler and was requisitioned by the Kriegsmarine in 1939 and converted into a lookout trawler. She was then fitted with concealed torpedo tubes and the Kriegsmarine added super heaters to the boilers to improve speed for short "sprints" as may be needed.  She was intended to put to sea with general trawlers in the hope of attacking any allied shipping that came within torpedo range. She was captured by HMS Arrow off Norway on 26 April 1940 and escorted back to Scapa Flow as a war-prize by HMS Griffin.

As a war-prize, Polaris was commissioned as HMS Spindrift and was initially used for submarine crew training in Portland but was later converted to a [Minelayer|
controlled minelayer], emerging from the dockyards in January 1942.   She was transferred to Saldanha Bay on the Cape West Coast under command of the Royal Navy South Atlantic station in Simon's Town, being responsible for laying controlled minefield defences in the South African coastal waters.

HMS Spindrift was fully handed over to the SA Naval Forces on 5 July 1943 at Simon's Town and was renamed HMSAS Spindrift, now crewed by the South African Naval Forces. At the end of the war, she remained in Saldanha Bay until 1948 when she was towed to Durban by the frigate HMSAS Transvaal and was laid up in care and maintenance at Salisbury Island as part of the Reserve Fleet.  In 1951 she was renamed HMSAS Skilpad (the name Skilpad translates to Tortoise and was an apt reflection of her (lack of) speed - without the super heaters which had been removed whilst in the Royal Navy; top speed was 9 knots!).

Fate 
Skilpad sank at her berth at Salisbury Island, Durban on 22 July 1953 during a NE gale. Although considerable efforts were made to raise her, the ship never went back to sea again and was eventually sold for scrap in May 1957 and broken up in Durban.

Notes and references

Notes

Citations

Bibliography

 
 
 

Ships of the South African Navy
Maritime history of South Africa
Mine warfare vessels of the South African Navy
1936 ships